This is a list of Xbox 360 games that were released via retail disc, digital download or as part of the Xbox Live Arcade program.

There are  games on both parts of this list.

Cancelled games

Notes

External links
 A list with screens and videos for cancelled Xbox 360 games and prototypes
 List of cancelled Xbox 360 video games

Xbox 360